WCRR may refer to:

 WCRR (FM), a radio station (88.9 FM) licensed to serve Manistique, Michigan, United States
 WNBL (FM), a radio station (107.3 FM) licensed to serve South Bristol, New York, United States, which used the call sign WCRR from 2007 to 2009
 WXBX, a radio station (95.3 FM) licensed to Rural Retreat, Virginia, United States, which used the call sign WCRR-FM from 1991 to 1994
 WLOY (AM), a radio station (660 AM) licensed to Rural Retreat, Virginia, United States, which used the call sign WCRR from 1985 to 2007
 WCRR world congress on railway research
 White Civil Rights Rally